Coenzyme B is a coenzyme required for redox reactions in methanogens. The full chemical name of coenzyme B is 7-mercaptoheptanoylthreoninephosphate.  The molecule contains a thiol, which is its principal site of reaction.

Coenzyme B reacts with 2-methylthioethanesulfonate (methyl-Coenzyme M, abbreviated ), to release methane in methanogenesis:
 + HS–CoB  →    +  CoB–S–S–CoM
This conversion is catalyzed by the enzyme methyl coenzyme M reductase, which contains cofactor F430 as the prosthetic group.

A related conversion that utilizes both HS-CoB and HS-CoM is the reduction of fumarate to succinate, catalyzed by fumarate reductase:
HS–CoM + HS–CoB +  − →  −  +  CoB–S–S–CoM

Importance of Coenzyme B in Methanogenesis

Coenzyme B is an important component in the terminal step of methane biogenesis. It acts as a two electron-donor to reduce coenzyme M (methyl-coenzyme) into two molecules a methane and a heterodisulfide. Two separate experiment that were performed, one with coenzyme B and other without coenzyme B, indicated that using coenzyme B before the formation of the methane molecule, results in a more efficient and consistent bond cleavage.

References

Coenzymes
Thiols
Carboxamides